Houria Aïchi (born in Batna) is an Algerian Berber singer of chaoui music. Aïchi sings songs that she learnt in her childhood, accompanied by bendir.

Biography 

Born in Aurès, Houria Aïchi went to study psychology in Paris in the 1970s. While teaching sociology, she started to perform in 1985, singing traditional songs of her childhood (lullabies, love songs), accompanied by traditional instruments (gasbâ , bendir), Her first two released albums did not open doors.

Houria Aïchi also participated in the  music for the film The Sheltering Sky by Bernardo Bertolucci (1990).

Houria Aïchi performed both in 2008 and 2013 at the festival Au fil des voix (fr).  She performed regularly in Paris from the 1990s. After the winter season of 2017–18 in France,  Houria Aïchi was invited to the "Festival Salam Orient" on October 21, 2019 in Vienna.

Discography
 Chants De L'aurés (1990, Auvidis – Naïve)
Hawa (1996, Auvidis)
Khalwa, chants sacrés de l'Algérie (2001, Virgin Classics)

 Houria Aïchi & Henri Agnel.
 Chants Sacrés d'Algérie (Sacred Songs from Algeria) (2005, Angel Records)
Songs of the Aures – Arabic Berber Songs by Houria Aichi (2006, NAIVE WORLD)
Renayate (2013, Harmonia Mundi)
Chants Mystiques D'algeri (2017 NAIVE WORLD)

Houria Aïchi & l'Hijâz'Car 
Les Cavaliers de l'Aurès (Riders of the Aurès) (2008 agreements with Harmonia Mundi) 

Compilation

 The Rough Guide to the Music of North Africa (1997, World Music Network)

Footnotes

Notes

References

External links 
Houria Aïchi and the Hijâz'Car "Cavaliers de l'Aurès" – Mystical chantes of Algeria – Accords Croisés 

Living people
Year of birth missing (living people)
21st-century Algerian women singers
People from Batna, Algeria
Berber musicians
20th-century Algerian  women singers